Kleinfeld is a surname of German origin. The name means "little field" or "small field".

People surnamed Kleinfeld
 Andrew Kleinfeld (born 1945), American federal judge, husband to Judith
 Gerald R. Kleinfeld, founder of the German Studies Association
 Judith Kleinfeld, American professor and author, wife to Andrew
 Klaus Kleinfeld, German businessman
 Philip M. Kleinfeld (1894–1971), New York politician and judge

See also 
 Klinefelter

German-language surnames